Louis Alfred "Pinky" Clarke (November 23, 1901 – February 24, 1977) was an American athlete, winner of a gold medal in 4 × 100 m relay at the 1924 Summer Olympics.

Clarke was Jewish, and was born in Statesville, North Carolina.  Clarke won, as a Johns Hopkins University student, the NCAA  championships in 1923.

At the Paris Olympics, Clarke ran the second leg in the American 4 × 100 m relay team, which won the gold medal in a new world record of 41.0.

Clarke also held the world indoor 100 y record, at 9.8 seconds, in February 1924.

Clarke died in Fishkill, New York aged 75.

See also
 List of select Jewish track and field athletes

References

1901 births
1977 deaths
American male sprinters
Athletes (track and field) at the 1924 Summer Olympics
Olympic gold medalists for the United States in track and field
Jewish American sportspeople
Jewish male athletes (track and field)
Johns Hopkins University alumni
Medalists at the 1924 Summer Olympics
People from Statesville, North Carolina
20th-century American Jews